Paoli is an unincorporated community in Madison County, in the U.S. state of Georgia.

History
A post office called Paoli was established in 1854, and remained in operation until 1903. The community's name is a transfer from Paoli, Pennsylvania.

The Paoli Historic District, centered around the junction of County Roads 334 and 331, was added to the National Register of Historic Places in 2002.

References

Unincorporated communities in Madison County, Georgia
Unincorporated communities in Georgia (U.S. state)